An Organic Law in Spanish law under the present Spanish Constitution of 1978 must be passed by an absolute majority of the Congress of Deputies (not merely a majority of those voting). The Spanish Constitution specifies that some areas of law should be regulated by this procedure, such as the Laws of Development of Fundamental Rights and Freedoms contained in the first section of Chapter Two of Title I of the Constitution, which was the basis for the Statutes of Autonomy of the various autonomous communities of Spain. Prior to the 1978 constitution this concept had no precedent in Spain. It was inspired by a similar concept in the current French Constitution of 1958, which established the French Fifth Republic.

In legal terms, organic laws are at the same level as ordinary laws. The difference between the two is in the more restrictive process for creating organic laws and in the matters that they regulate.

Definition and application
Article 81.1 of the Spanish Constitution says: "Organic laws are those related to the development of fundamental rights and public liberties, those that approve Statutes of Autonomy and the general electoral regime, and others foreseen in the Constitution."

In compliance with this, Organic Laws include the following:

Those that develop the fundamental rights and public liberties mentioned in Articles 15–29 of the Constitution). An example is the Organic Law on Education (Spanish:Ley Orgánica de Educación) that expands upon Article 27 of the Constitution.
Statutes of Autonomy. An example is the revised Statute of Autonomy of Andalusia, Ley Orgánica 2/2007, adopted 19 March 2007.
The general electoral regime, currently (as of 2009) regulated by Ley Orgánica 5/1985, adopted 19 June 1985.
"…others foreseen in the Constitution." There are a number of matters in the Constitution that presume development by laws. In some cases it is explicit that these are to be developed by Organic Law. For example:
The basis of military organization (Article 8.2)
Ley Orgánica 6/1980 (1 July 1980), which regulates basic criteria of National Defense and Military Organization. 
The institution of the Defensor del Pueblo (literally "Public Defender"), a type of ombudsman (Article 54)
Ley Orgánica 3/1981 (6 April 1981), of the Defensor del Pueblo
Suspension of the rights recognized in Articles 17.2, 18.2 and 18.3 in relation to investigations related to the activities of armed groups or terrorist elements (Article 55.2)
Ley Orgánica 9/1984, (26 December 1984), against the activities of armed groups and terrorist elements, and the development of Article 55.2 of the Constitution
Abdications and renunciations and any doubt of fact or right that occurs in the line of succession of the throne of Spain (Article 57.5)
Regulation of the direct election of Senators (Article 69.)
Ley Orgánica 5/1985 (19 June 1985), of the general election regime (Ley Orgánica del Régimen Electoral General, LOREG
Forms of exercise and requirements for popular initiative for the presentation of propositions of law (Article 87.3)
Ley Orgánica 3/1984 (28 March 1984), regulation of popular legislative initiative
The conditions and procedure for the several modalities of referendum foreseen in the Constitution (Article 92.3)
Ley Orgánica 2/1980 (18 January 1980), about regulation of the several modalities of referendum
Authorization of treaties under which an international organization or institution can exercise competencies derived from the Constitution (Article 93)
Ley Orgánica 10/1985 (2 August 1985), authorization for the adhesion of Spain to the European Community (later European Union)
Functions, basic principles of activity and statutes of security and police forces (Article 104.2)
Ley Orgánica 2/1986 (13 March 1986), about security and police forces
Composition and competency of the Council of State (Consejo de Estado) (Article 107)
Ley Orgánica 3/1980 (22 April 1980) of the Council of State
Regulation of states of emergency—the Spanish constitution distinguishes a state of alarm, a state of exception, and a state of siege—and the corresponding competencies and limitations (Article 116.1)
Ley Orgánica 4/1981 (1 June 1981), of states of alarm, exception and siege
Constitution, functioning and governing of Courts and Tribunals, and the legal status of judges and magistrates and staff for the administration of justice (Article 122.1)
Ley Orgánica 6/1985 (1 July 1985) of judicial power
The statute of the General Council of the Judicial Power and the regime of incompatibilities of its members and their functions, in particular the matters of appointment, ascent, inspection and disciplinary regime (Article 122)
Ley Orgánica 1/1980 (10 January 1980), of the General Council of the Judicial Power
Regulation of the naming of the twelve members of the General Council of the Judicial Power who are not named by proposal by the Congress and Senate (art. 122.3)
Ley Orgánica 1/1980 (10 January 1980), of the General Council of the Judicial Power
Composition, organization and functions of the Court of Accounts (Article 136.4)
Ley Orgánica 2/1982 (12 May 1982) of the Court of Accounts
Alteration of provincial borders (Article 141.1)
Authorization for the constitution of uniprovincial autonomous communities [that is, cases where a single province constitutes an autonomous community] that do not meet the conditions of Article 143.1 (Article 144 a)
Ley Orgánica 6/1982 (7 July 1982), which authorizes the constitution of the Autonomous Community of Madrid
Authorization or accord of statutes of autonomy for territories that are not integrated into the organization of provinces  (Article 144 b)
Ley Orgánica 1/1995 (13 March 1995), on the Statute of Autonomy of Ceuta
Ley Orgánica 2/1995 (13 March 1995), on the Statute of Autonomy of Melilla
Substitution of the initiative of local corporations referred to in Article 143.2 (Article 144 c)
Ley Orgánica 13/1980 (16 December 1980), substitution in the province of Almería of the autonomic initiative
Reform of statutes of autonomy (Article 147.3)
Ley Orgánica 6/2006 (19 July 2006) on the reform of the Statute of Autonomy of Catalonia.
Regulation of the coordination and other faculties of the autonomous communities in relation to local police (Article 148.1.22)
Ley Orgánica 2/1986 (13 March 1986), about security and police forces
Creation of police forces for the autonomous communities in the form established in their respective Statutes [of autonomy] (Article 149.1.29)
Ley Orgánica 2/1986 (13 March 1986), about security and police forces
Transfer or delegation of state competencies [that is, those of Spain itself] to the autonomous communities (Article 150.2)
Ley Orgánica 9/1992 (23 December 1992), on transference of competencies to autonomous communities that accede to autonomy by means of the path of Article 143 of the ConstitutionRegulation of the referendum foreseen in Article 151.1 (Article 151.1)Ley Orgánica 2/1980 (18 January 1980), about regulation of the several modalities of referendum
Regulation for the possibility that in case of the failure to approve a project of a Statute [of autonomy] by one or several provinces via referendum, the other [provinces of that proposed autonomous community] can constitute an autonomous community (Article 151.5)
Ley Orgánica 2/1980 (18 January 1980), about regulation of the several modalities of referendum
Exercise of the financial competencies enumerated in Article 157.1, the norms to resolve conflicts that may arise and the possible forms of financial collaboration between the Autonomous Communities and the State (Article 157.3)
Ley Orgánica 8/1980 (22 September 1980), on the financing of the Autonomous Communities
Competency of the Constitutional Court of Spain (Article 161.1.d)
Ley Orgánica 2/1979 (3 October 1979), on the Constitutional Court (Ley Orgánica del Tribunal Constitucional - LOTC)
Determination of the persons and organs legitimated before the Constitutional Court (Article 162.2)
Ley Orgánica 2/1979 (3 October 1979), on the Constitutional Court (LOTC)
Functioning of the Constitutional Court, the statute of its members, the procedure before the same, and the conditions for the exercise of its actions (Article 165)
Ley Orgánica 2/1979 (3 October 1979), on the Constitutional Court (LOTC)
Organic Law 1/2004 (28 December 2004) on Comprehensive Protection Measures against Gender Violence
 Adapting the Spanish domestic law on the General Data Protection Regulation
Ley Orgánica 3/2018 (05 December 2018) on Protection of Personal Data and Guarantee of Digital Rights

Approval

The Constitution, in Article 81.2, says: "The approval, modification or derogation of organic laws requires an absolute majority of the Congress, in a final vote over the entire project."
 That is to say, an organic law is presented as a project (by the government) or as a proposition of law (by the Cortes Generales) and must follow the same parliamentary procedures as an ordinary law. As the Constitution indicates, the principal difference in the process is that the Congress of Deputies must make a final vote, at the end of the entire process, where the law must obtain an absolute majority to be approved; for ordinary laws, this final vote is not required.

Article 87 of the Constitution establishes who may take legislative initiative to put a project or proposal of law (whether organic or ordinary) before the Cortes. Article 87.3 says, "An organic law will regulate the forms of exercise and requisites for a popular initiative for the presentation of propositions of law. In all cases, no fewer that 500,000 accredited signatures will be required. There shall be no such initiative in matters proper to organic law, treaties or laws of international character, nor in relation to the prerogative of mercy." Therefore, the government, the Congress, the Senate and the legislative assemblies of the autonomous communities can initiate the legislative processes that lead to the approval of an organic law (Articles 87.1 and 87.2); in contrast, popular initiatives are not permitted in this area.

Organic law as a source of law
In its more than 25 years existence, the Constitutional Court of Spain has made a particularly restrictive  interpretation of the matters susceptible to regulation by organic law. The relation of organic law with ordinary law is not a hierarchical relationship but one of competency (scope).

See also
Organic Law

Notes

Law of Spain